Pedro Antonio Ramírez Paredes (born 24 August 1992) is a Venezuelan footballer who plays as an attacking midfielder for Zamora.

External links

References

1992 births
Living people
Association football midfielders
Venezuelan footballers
Venezuelan expatriate footballers
Venezuelan expatriate sportspeople in Switzerland
Venezuela international footballers
Deportivo Táchira F.C. players
Zamora FC players
FC Sion players
Asociación Civil Deportivo Lara players
Venezuelan Primera División players
Swiss Super League players
Expatriate footballers in Switzerland
21st-century Venezuelan people